The Carl Maddox Field House is an indoor track and field facility located on the campus of Louisiana State University in Baton Rouge, Louisiana. The facility, built in 1975, serves as the indoor home of the LSU Tigers track and field team and the LSU Lady Tigers track and field team. The stadium has a seating capacity of 3,000. In 1998, the facility was renamed in honor of former LSU Athletic Director Carl Maddox during the SEC Indoor Championships. Maddox was a fan of track and field and a major force in building the field house.

The field house features a 200-meter unbanked track, elevated jump runways, a variety of throwing areas and multiple high jump and vaulting areas.

Carl Maddox Field House also hosts the LHSAA Indoor Track & Field State Championships. and youth indoor track meets.

See also
 Bernie Moore Track Stadium
 LSU Tigers track and field
 LSU Lady Tigers track and field

References

External links

 

College indoor track and field venues in the United States
Indoor track and field venues in Louisiana
Indoor arenas in Louisiana
LSU Tigers and Lady Tigers track and field venues
Sports venues in Louisiana
Sports venues completed in 1975
1975 establishments in Louisiana